Johannes Pistorius may refer to:

 Jan de Bakker van Woerden (1499–1525), Dutch Catholic priest who was the first to be martyred for Protestant beliefs
 Johann Pistorius the Elder (1504–1583), German Protestant minister, who participated in several religious disputations between Catholics and Protestants
 Johann Pistorius Niddanus (the Younger) (1546–1608), German controversialist and historian, son of Johann Pistorius the Elder
 Johan Pistorius (died 1722), Danish grenadier executed for witchcraft
 Johannes Pistorius (badminton) (born 1995), German badminton player